The Firuz Ağa Mosque is a 15th-century Ottoman mosque in the Fatih district of Istanbul, Turkey. It was built by Firuz Ağa, the head treasurer of Sultan Beyazıt II. The marble sarcophagus of Firuz Ağa is located in the mosque complex. The mosque is located in the historical center of the city of Istanbul, on the Divanyolu Street, close to other prominent historical landmarks, Sultanahmet Mosque, Aya Sofya and Basilica Cistern.

References 
 Firuz Ağa Mosque at Istanbul Metropolitan Municipality website

External links
 

Mosques completed in 1491
Ottoman mosques in Istanbul
1490s establishments in the Ottoman Empire
Mosque buildings with domes
Fatih